Laura Bordignon (born 26 March 1981 in Bassano del Grappa) is an Italian discus thrower and shot putter.

Biography
She won one medal, at senior level, at the International athletics competitions. She has 23 caps in national team from 2003 to 2012.

Achievements

National titles
Laura Bordignon has won 11 times the individual national championship.
5 wins in the discus throw (2006, 2008, 2009, 2010, 2011)
6 wins in the discus throw at the Italian Winter Throwing Championships (2008, 2009, 2010, 2011, 2012, 2014)

See also
 Italian all-time lists - Discus throw

References

External links
 

1981 births
Living people
Italian female discus throwers
Italian female shot putters
People from Bassano del Grappa
Mediterranean Games silver medalists for Italy
Athletes (track and field) at the 2005 Mediterranean Games
Mediterranean Games medalists in athletics
Sportspeople from the Province of Vicenza
20th-century Italian women
21st-century Italian women